A honeypot site is a location attractive to tourists who, due to their numbers, place pressure on the environment and local people.

Honeypots are often used by cities or countries to manage their tourism industry. The use of honeypots can protect fragile land away from major cities while satisfying less discerning tourists. One such example is the construction of local parks to prevent tourists from damaging more valuable ecosystems farther from their main destination. Honeypots have the added benefit of concentrating many income-generating visitors in one place, therefore developing that area, and in turn making the area more appealing to tourists.

However, honeypots can suffer from problems of overcrowding, including litter, vandalism, and strain on facilities and transport networks. Honeypots attract tourists because of parking spaces, shopping centres, parks and public toilets. The tourist shops are normally placed all over the shopping centre, which creates pressure on the whole centre to keep the place looking tidy. For example, Stratford-upon-Avon has shops that are aimed mostly at tourists.  On a particular street, there were five shops that were aimed towards the locals and ten shops catering to tourists, reflecting the business opportunity that tourism presents for shopkeepers and other business people in the local economy.

References

Tourism geography
Tourist attractions
Geography terminology